Richmond Park is a Royal Park in London.

Richmond Park may also refer to:

Australia
 Richmond Park, a park in Richmond, New South Wales
 Richmond Park, racehorse stud of James Henry Aldridge in South Australia
 Richmond Park, a park in Richmond, Victoria
 Richmond Park railway station
 Richmond Paddock, now known as Yarra Park, a park in East Melbourne, Victoria

United Kingdom

 Richmond Park (UK Parliament constituency), London
Richmond Park, Bournemouth, a suburb of Bournemouth
 Richmond Park (Carmarthen), a football stadium in Wales
 A public park in Oatlands, Glasgow, Scotland
 A road junction in Eastfield, South Lanarkshire, Scotland

Elsewhere
 Richmond Park (football ground), Ireland
 Richmond Park, Jamaica, a neighbourhood of Kingston, Jamaica